The Clementi Clinic is a former surgical facility located on Viale Regina Margherita in Catania, region of Sicily, Italy. It was erected in 1904 and designed by Carlo Sada in a Liberty style (Italian Art Nouveau). It presently houses offices of the Intesa San Paolo bank. The building is remarkable for the large windows in the upper floor used to provide natural light for the surgical suite.

References

Further reading
 Antonio Rocca: Il liberty a Catania, Magma, Catania 1984
 Franca Restuccia: Catania nel '900: dall'architettura eclettica allo stile liberty, Gangemi, Roma 2003

Buildings and structures in Catania
Art Nouveau architecture in Italy
1904 establishments in Italy